Samuel Bernstein may refer to:
 Samuel Bernstein (born 1970), American screenwriter, director and author
 Samuel Bernstein (historian) (1898–1987), French historian
 Samuil Bernstein (1911–1997), Soviet linguist
 Sam Born (1891–1959), American businessman, candy maker, and inventor with the birth name Samuel Bernstein
 The Law Offices of Sam Bernstein